Trinity Episcopal Cathedral in Portland, Oregon is a progressive Episcopal congregation and the seat of the Episcopal Diocese of Oregon of The Episcopal Church. The cathedral is located at 147 NW 19th Avenue in Portland, Oregon, in the Northwest District.

The legal name of the cathedral corporation is Trinity Episcopal Cathedral, Portland, Oregon. It was originally organized on March 18, 1873 as Trinity Episcopal Church, Portland, Oregon and was renamed as a cathedral on February 17, 1994, after the Episcopal Bishop of Oregon relocated the diocesan seat to the current location in the previous year. The Rt. Rev. Robert Louis Ladehoff, the Eighth Bishop of Oregon, consecrated the cathedral on November 19, 1993. Prior to 1993, the seat of the Diocese of Oregon was the then Cathedral of St. John the Baptist since 1973, which, in turn was relocated from the then St. Stephen's Cathedral.

The cathedral serves as the central parish of the Episcopal diocese whose jurisdiction includes the parts of Oregon west of the Cascade Mountains. Approximately 1800 active parishioners attend the cathedral's Eucharist services and participate in various activities. In addition, Trinity Episcopal Cathedral has operated since 2002 the Center for Spiritual Development under the direction of the Rev. Canon Marianne Wells Borg; the center was merged with the cathedral's adult education program on August 1, 2008.

The Dean of the cathedral is the Very Rev. Nathan LeRud, who is assisted by the Rev. Matthew Lawrence (Canon for Spiritual Development), the Rev. Linda Potter (Interim Canon Associate), as well as a number of non-stipendiary clergy, such as the Very Rev. Roy Coulter (former Dean of the Cathedral of St. John the Baptist, Portland), the Very Rev. Hollingshead "Lin" Knight (former Dean of the Cathedral Church of St. Andrew, Honolulu, Hawaii), the Very Rev. John Bright, the Rev. Canon Jack Hilyard, the  Rev. Canon Joseph Dubay, the Rev. Canon Patrick Tompter, the Rev. John Scannel, the Rt. Rev. Robert Ladehoff, the Rev. Maureen Tighe, and the Rev. Deacon Valerie Ivey. The New Testament scholar and author Marcus Borg served as Canon Theologian.

Portland Mayor Ted Wheeler, whose mother was a member, attends occasionally.

History

On May 18, 1851, the Rev. St. Michael Fackler and the Rev. William Richmond along with four parishioners organized Trinity Episcopal Church in the city of Portland, Oregon, and secured permission to hold services in the newly completed school house.  It was the first Episcopal congregation organized in the Oregon Territory.  Fackler and Richmond went on to organize parishes in Oregon City, Champoeg, Lafayette, and Milwaukie before the year was over.

In 1853 the congregation had grown to 25 parishioners, and called its first rector, the Rev. John D. McCarty.  Construction began on a permanent building, located at the corner of Southwest Second Avenue and Oak Street in Portland on land donated by parishioner Benjamin Stark, a prominent lawyer and citizen.  When this building, essentially a log cabin, was consecrated by the newly elected Missionary Bishop of the vast Missionary District of the Oregon and Washington Territories, the Right Rev. Thomas Fielding Scott, it was the first Episcopal church building north of San Francisco and west of St. Paul.

By 1871, Trinity had grown to over 200 members.  The congregation had purchased a half block at the corner of Southwest Sixth Avenue and Oak Street for $3,000.  In 1872 a new church building was built on this site that was thought to more accurately reflect the congregation's (and the City of Portland's) stature.  The Vestry voted that the Chancel window of this church was to be a memorial to Bishop Thomas F. Scott.  This window, which was saved when 1872 building burned, is now in the East wall of the present cathedral.  The congregation in this period included many prominent Portlanders, including Cicero Hunt Lewis, Sylvester Pennoyer, Rodney Glisan, and Matthew Deady.  In 1873, Trinity was involved in the founding of Good Samaritan Hospital.  In 1902, the church building at Sixth and Oak was heavily damaged by fire, and the congregation decided to relocate yet again, to the more fashionable NW 19th Avenue, where many wealthy parishioners lived.  This new building, in which the congregation still worships, was consecrated on October 14, 1906.  The stained glass windows, the work of the Charles J. Connick Studios of Boston, date from the late 1940s.

In the late 1970s the Episcopal Church was undergoing a period of liturgical renewal, with the adoption of a new Book of Common Prayer. Under the leadership of Trinity's rector, the Reverend William H. Wagner, Jr., the Cathedral was redesigned and renovated to better reflect a new understanding of worship. The altar was moved forward, closer to the congregation, and the chancel was redesigned to allow for more flexible seating. This redesign, completed in 1983, coincided with the building of a new organ, and Trinity hired young organ designer Manuel Rosales to begin construction on a new instrument. In 1987 the Rosales Organ, Opus 11, was completed and has since earned acclaim as one of the finest organs in the country.

See also

List of cathedrals in the United States
List of the Episcopal cathedrals of the United States

References

External links
 Trinity Episcopal Cathedral
 Oregon Secretary of State filing information for Trinity Episcopal Cathedral, Portland, Oregon
 Oregon Secretary of State filing information for Center for Spiritual Development

1851 establishments in Oregon Territory
Churches completed in 1904
Churches in Portland, Oregon
Episcopal cathedrals in the United States
Episcopal churches in Oregon
Religious organizations established in 1851